Kala Suri Attanayake Mudiyanselage Podi Manike (born August 23, 1947), popularly as Manike Attanayake, is an actress in Sri Lankan cinema, theater and television. She is best known for the role in television serial Palingu Manike. In 1987, she was honored with "Kalasuri", becoming the youngest Sri Lankan to win that award.

Personal life
Manike Attanayake was born on 23 August 1947 in Thalwatte, Kandy as the youngest of the family with five siblings. Her father, Wilson Attanayake was a renowned Sokeri actor in Kandy who worked at Cargills Company. Her mother Ran Manike Attanayake was a housewife. Attanayake completed education from Senkadagala Maha Vidyalaya, currently known as D. S. Senanayaka College, Kandy and Mahamaya Girls' College, Kandy. One of her elder sisters, Kumari Manike also acted in many stage dramas.

She is married to retired police officer Raja Attanayake and the couple has two sons and one daughter.

Acting career
Attanayake joined with "Ranga Shilpa Shalika" at Lionel Wendt Art Centre to start stage drama acting. She studied drama and theater under renowned dramatist Dhamma Jagoda, who converted her name into stage name "Manike Attanayake". Her maiden stage drama acting came through Ediriweera Sarachchandra's Maname in 1976. In 1979, Attanayake engaged as a singer in Sri Lanka Broadcasting Corporation with a versatile range of singing in Noorthi, Nadagam and Classical.

Meanwhile, she started to act in many popular stage plays such as Sarachchandra's Sinhabahu, Lomahansa, Mahasara, Wessanthara, R.R. Samarakoon's Kelani Palama, W.B. Makuloluwa's Depano, Dayananda Gunawardena's Nari Bena, Dikthala Kalagola and Modara Mola. In 1981, Attanayake won the award for Best Actor at State Drama Festival for the role "Paththini" in the play Mini Salamba.

She is one of the earliest pillars in Sri Lankan television history. She acted in many popular serials including Palingu Manike, Ella Langa Walawwa, Yashorawaya, Parana Tawuma, Nelli Gedara and Anu Nawayen Nawaya.

Her maiden cinematic experience came through 1981 film Sudda directed by Rathnaweera De Silva. She generally acted in many supportive roles in cinema. Some of her popular films are Niliyakata Pem Kalemi, Seilama and Parliament Jokes.

Selected television serials

 Anu Nawayen Nawaya
 Denuwara Manike 
 Deweni Gamana 
 Dikkasadaya 
 Ella Langa Walawwa
 Induwara
 Kele Handa 
 Mal Kekulak 
 Mano Mandira
 Medagedara 
 Medi Sina
 Nelli Gedara
 Niyan Kurullo
 Nomerena Minisun
 Palingu Manike
 Parana Tawuma
 Piththala Konderuma 
 Sandagalathenna 
 Sikuru Lanthe
 Wasuda
 Yashorawaya

Songs
None Mage Sudu None with Sunil Perera

Ethata Yami Piyabala

Hunuwataye Kathaya

Rathdare Siriya Paradana

Selected stage dramas

 Depano
 Deiyo Sakki 
 Dikthala Kalagola 
 Lomahansa
 Kelani Palama
 Mahasara
 Manamalaya
 Maname
 Mini Salamba
 Modara Mola
 Nari Bena
 Sinhabahu
 Wessanthara

Filmography

References

External links
 "එහෙම සම්බන්ධයක් ඇත්තටම තියෙනවා නම් කවදාවත් මම ඒ දේ කෙලින් කියන්න බය වෙන්නෙ නෑ" - මැණිකේ අත්තනායක
 අපි දැන් කම්කරුවෝ වගේ.. මැණිකේ අත්තනායක
 පළිඟු මැණිකේ නිහඬ වූ හේතුව මෙන්න

Living people
Sri Lankan film actresses
1947 births